The Steuben Memorial State Historic Site is a historic location in the eastern part of Steuben, Oneida County, New York, that honors Baron von Steuben, the "Drillmaster of the American Revolution". The land in this part of Oneida County was part of a  land grant made to von Steuben for his services to the United States. He used the land for his summer residence, and is buried at the memorial, a "Sacred Grove".

The site includes the memorial tomb and reconstructed log cabin (1937) and several smaller elements, including a stone bearing a memorial plaque, a series of historic markers, and a landscaping structure.  The site also offers a picnic area, scenic views, tours, re-enactments, educational assistance, and demonstrations.

It was listed on the National Register of Historic Places in 2009.

See also 
List of New York State Historic Sites

References

External links 
  Steuben State Historic Site

American Revolutionary War sites
New York (state) historic sites
Parks in Oneida County, New York
Monuments and memorials on the National Register of Historic Places in New York (state)
National Register of Historic Places in Oneida County, New York